Valley of Three Ponds ) is a large park and wooden area in the southern part of the city of Katowice, Poland. The name comes from the existence of three large ponds in the park area.

Parks in Katowice
Reservoirs in Poland
Landforms of Silesian Voivodeship